The 2001 Vuelta a Castilla y León was the 16th edition of the Vuelta a Castilla y León cycle race and was held on 5 August to 9 August 2001. The race started in Segovia and finished at the Alto de Redondal. The race was won by Marcos-Antonio Serrano.

Teams
Seventeen teams of up to eight riders started the race:

 
 
 
 
 
 
 
 
 
 
 
 
 
 
 Nürnberger
 Team Fakta
 Bankgiroloterij–Batavus

General classification

References

Vuelta a Castilla y León
Vuelta a Castilla y León by year
2001 in Spanish sport